Floyd Wayne Heard (born March 24, 1966, in West Point, Mississippi) is a retired track and field sprinter from the United States, best known for setting the 1986 world's best year performance in the men's 200 m. He did so on 7 July 1986 at a meet in Moscow, Soviet Union, clocking 20.12s. A year later he won the title in the men's 200 m at the 1987 Pan American Games.

Heard's personal best for the 200 m was 19.88 seconds, set at the U.S. Olympic Trials in Sacramento on 23 July 2000. That was the race where favorites Michael Johnson and Maurice Greene were pitted as rivals by the media. In a head-to-head battle, both pulled up during the race, leaving Heard to pick up the pieces behind newcomer John Capel, at age 34 becoming the oldest sprinter to make his first American Olympic team.

Background 
Heard attended John Marshall High School in Milwaukee, Wisconsin (graduating 1985) and Texas A&M.  While at A&M, Heard worked with world-renowned conditioning coach Istvan Javorek.

Floyd Heard also owns the American record as part of the Santa Monica Track Club's scorching performance of 1:18.68 in 1994 in the 4 × 200 m relay run, set at the Mt. SAC Relays. His teammates in that race were Mike Marsh, Leroy Burrell, and Carl Lewis.

References

 Floyd Heard profile at USATF
 1986 Year Rankings

External links
 Masters T&F 100 metres Dash All-Time Rankings  10.28 (2001)
 Masters T&F 200 metres Dash All-Time Rankings  20.31 (2002)
 Masters T&F 400 metres Dash All-Time Rankings 48.03 (2002)

1966 births
Living people
American male sprinters
People from West Point, Mississippi
Track and field athletes from Milwaukee
Track and field athletes from Mississippi
Athletes (track and field) at the 1987 Pan American Games
Athletes (track and field) at the 2000 Summer Olympics
Olympic track and field athletes of the United States
Pan American Games medalists in athletics (track and field)
Pan American Games gold medalists for the United States
Universiade medalists in athletics (track and field)
Goodwill Games medalists in athletics
Universiade gold medalists for the United States
Medalists at the 1987 Summer Universiade
Competitors at the 1986 Goodwill Games
Medalists at the 1987 Pan American Games